The 1978–79 NHL season was the 62nd season of the National Hockey League. The Montreal Canadiens beat the New York Rangers in the Stanley Cup finals four games to one for their fourth consecutive Cup; two "Original Six" teams would not meet again in the Finals for the next 34 years, when Chicago Blackhawks defeated the Boston Bruins in the 2013 Finals. The Bruins faced the Canadiens in the 1979 semifinals, marking the last appearance by three Original Six teams in the final four for the next 35 years, when the Blackhawks, Canadiens and Rangers reached the semifinals of the 2014 playoffs.

The Cleveland Barons merged with the Minnesota North Stars (continuing as the North Stars), reducing the NHL membership to 17 teams, the last time that the NHL contracted.

League business
This season saw the first reduction in the total number of teams since the Brooklyn Americans folded following the 1941–42 season. Fearing that two teams were on the verge of folding, the league approved the merger of the financially unstable Cleveland Barons and Minnesota North Stars franchises, reducing the number of teams to 17. The merged team continued as the Minnesota North Stars but assumed the Barons' place in the Adams Division.

This reduction would only be temporary, however, as negotiations continued toward an agreement with the World Hockey Association that would see it fold following this season, with four of its teams joining the NHL as expansion franchises for 1979–80.

For the first time since the NHL All-Star Game became an annual tradition, it was not played. In its stead was the 1979 Challenge Cup, which saw Soviet Union players come over to North America to play against NHL players. The Soviets won the series two games to one.

Regular season
For the past three seasons, the Montreal Canadiens had dominated the regular season, but times were changing. The New York Islanders had been steadily improving over the past few seasons and this season saw them beat out the Canadiens by one point for the best record in the league.

This was the last season until the 2005–06 season that the St. Louis Blues missed the playoffs.

Final standings
GP = Games Played, W = Wins, L = Losses, T = Ties, Pts = Points, GF = Goals For, GA = Goals Against, PIM = Penalties In Minutes

Teams that qualified for the playoffs are highlighted in bold

Prince of Wales Conference

Clarence Campbell Conference

Playoffs

Playoff seeds

The twelve teams that qualified for the playoffs are ranked 1–12 based on regular season points.

Note: Only teams that qualified for the playoffs are listed here.

 New York Islanders, Patrick Division champions, Clarence Campbell Conference regular season champions – 116 points
 Montreal Canadiens, Norris Division champions, Prince of Wales Conference regular season champions – 115 points
 Boston Bruins, Adams Division champions – 100 points
 Philadelphia Flyers – 95 points
 New York Rangers – 91 points
 Atlanta Flames – 90 points
 Buffalo Sabres – 88 points
 Pittsburgh Penguins – 85 points
 Toronto Maple Leafs – 81 points
 Los Angeles Kings – 80 points
 Chicago Black Hawks, Smythe Division champions – 73 points
 Vancouver Canucks – 63 points

Playoff bracket

 Division winners earned a bye to the Quarterfinals
 Teams were re-seeded based on regular season record after the Preliminary and Quarterfinal rounds

Stanley Cup Finals

Prior to 2013, this was the last time two Original Six clubs met in the finals.

Awards

All-Star teams

Player statistics

Scoring leaders
GP = Games Played, G = Goals, A = Assists, Pts = Points, PIM = Penalties In Minutes

Source: NHL.

Leading goaltenders

Note: GP = Games played; Min - Minutes played; GA = Goals against; GAA = Goals against average; W = Wins; L = Losses; T = Ties; SO = Shutouts

Other statistics
Plus-minus
 Bryan Trottier, New York Islanders

Coaches

Patrick Division
Atlanta Flames: Fred Creighton
New York Islanders: Al Arbour
New York Rangers: Fred Shero
Philadelphia Flyers: Bob McCammon and Pat Quinn

Adams Division
Boston Bruins: Don Cherry
Buffalo Sabres: Billy Inglis
Minnesota North Stars: Harry Howell and Glen Sonmor
Toronto Maple Leafs: Roger Neilson

Norris Division
Detroit Red Wings: Bobby Kromm
Los Angeles Kings: Bob Berry
Montreal Canadiens: Scotty Bowman
Pittsburgh Penguins: Johnny Wilson
Washington Capitals: Danny Belisle

Smythe Division
Chicago Black Hawks: Bill White
Colorado Rockies: Pat Kelly
St. Louis Blues: Barclay Plager
Vancouver Canucks: Harry Neale

Milestones

Debuts
The following is a list of players of note who played their first NHL game in 1978–79 (listed with their first team, asterisk (*) marks debut in playoffs):
Joel Quenneville, Toronto Maple Leafs
Brad Marsh, Atlanta Flames
Reggie Lemelin, Atlanta Flames
Al Secord, Boston Bruins
Bobby Smith, Minnesota North Stars
Steve Payne, Minnesota North Stars
Rod Langway §, Montreal Canadiens
John Tonelli §, New York Islanders
Anders Hedberg §, New York Rangers
Ulf Nilsson §, New York Rangers
Ken Linseman §, Philadelphia Flyers
Pete Peeters, Philadelphia Flyers
Greg Millen, Pittsburgh Penguins
Wayne Babych, St. Louis Blues
Curt Fraser, Vancouver Canucks
Thomas Gradin, Vancouver Canucks
Stan Smyl, Vancouver Canucks
Ryan Walter, Washington Capitals

Players marked with § began their major professional career in the World Hockey Association.

Last games
The following is a list of players of note that played their last game in the NHL in 1978–79 (listed with their last team):
Bobby Orr, Chicago Black Hawks
Joe Watson, Colorado Rockies
Danny Grant, Los Angeles Kings
J. P. Parise, Minnesota North Stars
Jacques Lemaire, Montreal Canadiens
Ken Dryden, Montreal Canadiens
Yvan Cournoyer, Montreal Canadiens
Ed Westfall, New York Islanders
Bernie Parent, Philadelphia Flyers
Garry Monahan, Toronto Maple Leafs
Pit Martin, Vancouver Canucks

See also 
 List of Stanley Cup champions
 1978 NHL Amateur Draft
 1978–79 NHL transactions
 1979 Challenge Cup
 1978–79 WHA season
 1978 in sports
 1979 in sports

References
 
 
 
 

Notes

External links
Hockey Database
NHL.com

 
1978–79 in Canadian ice hockey by league
1978–79 in American ice hockey by league